Paolaura cancellata is a species of very small sea snail, a marine gastropod mollusk or micromollusk in the family Granulinidae.

Distribution
This marine species occurs off Oman..

References

Granulinidae
Gastropods described in 2018